Paul Peterson (born 1964), also known as St. Paul Peterson, is an American singer and musician.

Paul Peterson may also refer to:

 Paul Peterson (golfer) (born 1988), American golfer
 Paul Peterson (American football) (born 1980), quarterback for the Boston College Eagles
 Paul Peterson (Canadian football) (born 1921), Canadian football player
 Paul Peterson (curler), American curler
 Paul E. Peterson, scholar on education reform

See also
 Paul Pedersen (disambiguation)
 Paul Petersen (born 1945), American actor, singer, novelist, and activist